St. Mary’s University is a private Catholic university in Calgary, Alberta.  A teaching and research university, St. Mary's is accredited by Alberta Advanced Education as an "Independent Academic Institution" and offers degrees in the liberal arts, sciences and education. The university has 875 full-time and part-time students, 80 full-time and part-time faculty, and an average class size of 25.

Administration
Dr. Sinda Vanderpool became St. Mary’s fourth president and vice-chancellor on July 1, 2022.

Academics 
St. Mary’s University is accredited to offer a Bachelor of Science degree, a Bachelor of Education after degree, eight Bachelor of Arts degrees including: 3 Year General Studies Degree, 4 Year Liberal Studies Degree, 3 and 4 Year English Degrees, 3 and 4 year History Degrees, 3 and 4 year Psychology Degrees, a 4 year Bachelor of Science in Biology program as well as transferable university courses in 35 academic disciplines.

Campus 
In addition to the academic expansion, the St. Mary's campus has undergone a major change. The land upon which the campus is situated accommodates several buildings, dating from the early 1900s, designated as provincial heritage buildings, including a wooden water tower. As the buildings have heritage status, this legally forbids any alteration of their exterior, with the exception of repair, a prohibition which does not extend to their interior.  Thus these buildings have been transformed into new classrooms, a bookstore, common areas and a cafeteria.  The water tower has been braced to protect it from collapse, and repainted in its original colour, Canadian Pacific Railway red, the only colour legally allowed due to its heritage status. In September 2016, the new Heritage Centre building was officially opened.

In 2011, St. Mary's initiated a site development planning process to identify guiding principles, development options and concept plans for its 35-acre campus.

St. Mary's library contains over 30,000 titles and has 51 workstations accessible by students. The St. Mary's library is also home to The St. John's Bible. It is a fully illuminated bible that is handwritten by world renowned calligrapher Donald Jackson (calligrapher) who is the scribe to the Queen of England. It is arguably the first time a cathedral, monastery or religious organization has commissioned something to this scale in over 500 years.

Student life
The student body of St. Mary's is represented by faculty and administration by the Student Legislative Council (SLC). St. Mary's University supports student-run clubs and activities. Current clubs include the Psychology Association, Student 4 Social Justice, D&D club, and SPECTRUM.  As of recently, the St. Mary's community had produced and premiered the play The Ghost Wilderness written by Dr Gerry Turcotte.

Athletics 
St. Mary’s University was a founding member of the Alberta Colleges Athletic League. The league is composed of small colleges and has affiliated members in Alberta and Saskatchewan.  The institution was accepted into the Alberta Colleges Athletic Conference (ACAC) in May 2010. Lightning basketball teams began competing at this level in Fall 2012. In the fall of 2014, Lightning introduced its Cross Country program, making it St. Mary’s University’s third team competing in the ACAC.

Arms

References

External links
Official website

Universities and colleges in Calgary
Catholic universities and colleges in Canada